Snyder Peak is a low ice-covered peak lying 1 nautical mile (1.9 km) southwest of Anderson Dome in the Jones Mountains. It was mapped by the University of Minnesota Jones Mountains Party of 1960–61. It was named by the Advisory Committee on Antarctic Names (US-ACAN) for David R. Snyder, an aviation electronics technician with U.S. Navy Squadron VX-6, and a crew member on pioneer flights of LC-47 Dakota aircraft from Byrd Station to the Eights Coast area in November 1961.

Mountains of Ellsworth Land